Din for evigt is the fourth studio album of Danish singer Burhan G. The album released on 7 October 2013 reached number one on Tracklisten the official Danish Albums Chart and was certified platinum.

The title track "Din for evigt" was pre-released on 11 March 2013, also being certified platinum.

Track list
All songs were produced by Burhan G, except for "Karma" jointly produced by Burhan G and Fridolin Nordsø.

Chart performance

Weekly charts

Year-end charts

Certification

References

2013 albums